Claes Yngve Elmstedt (31 March 1928 – 14 February 2018 in Ronneby) was a Swedish politician. He was a member of the Centre Party. He was elected to the second chamber of parliament from 1965 to 1970, and then from 1971 of the unicameral parliament until 1984.

He was Minister of Communications (Transport) in the government of Thorbjörn Fälldin 1981 to 1982 and county governor of Gotland County from 1984 to 1991.

References

1928 births
2018 deaths
People from Ronneby Municipality
Members of the Riksdag from the Centre Party (Sweden)
Swedish Ministers for Communications
Members of the Andra kammaren
Governors of Gotland